USS YO-257 was a Yard Oiler of the United States Navy that was scuttled two miles off Waikiki, Honolulu, Hawaii in 1989.

Service history
Built in                       1938, YO-257 saw action in World War II, the Korean War, and in the Vietnam War.

From 16 September to 12 November 1963 the ship was temporarily loaned to the Coast Guard to assist in the construction of a LORAN radio navigation station in Yap, Western Carolines, carrying water-based asphalt to be used for a runway for aircraft servicing the station.

After decommissioning, the ship was purchased by Atlantis Submarines Hawaii, who sank it as an artificial reef. Directly abeam to the YO-257, colloquially called the YO by area divers, is the San Pedro, intentionally sunk by Atlantis Submarines in 1996. The two ships are visited frequently by Atlantis and are popular dive sites. There is sometimes a strong current at the surface, which eases as you approach the wreck. A descent line is always rigged to mooring buoys on the wreck. The typical dive profile is 90 feet for 20 minutes. There is a preponderance of marine life on both ships, mostly turtles and reef sharks, such as the whitetip reef shark.

References

External links
 YO-257 – Oahu Dive Sites
 Video of the YO-257
 NavSource Online

Oilers of the United States Navy
1940 ships
Ships sunk as artificial reefs
Maritime incidents in 1989